NA-14 Mansehra-I is a constituency for the National Assembly of Pakistan. The constituency was formerly known as NA-20 (Mansehra-I) from 1977 to 2018. The name changed to NA-13 (Mansehra-I) after the delimitation in 2018 and to NA-14 (Mansehra-I) after the delimitation in 2022.

Members of Parliament

1977–2002: NA-20 Mansehra-I

2002–2018: NA-20 Mansehra-I

2018-2022: NA-13 Mansehra-I

Elections since 2002

2002 general election

A total of 3,379 votes were rejected.

2008 general election

A total of 3,669 votes were rejected.

2013 general election

A total of 8,452 votes were rejected.

2018 general election 

General elections were held on 25 July 2018.

†JI and JUI-F contested as part of MMA'

See also
NA-13 Battagram
NA-15 Mansehra-cum-Torghar

References

External links 
Election result's official website

13
13